Evdochia of Kiev, also known as Evdokia (died in 1467), was a Princess of Moldavia as the first or second wife of Stephen III of Moldavia.

Early life 
Evdochia was born into the large House of Gediminid, as the second daughter and fourth child of Alexander Olelkovich, Prince of Kiev (d. 1454) and his wife, Anastasia of Moscow (1470), daughter of Vasily I of Moscow and Sophia of Lithuania. She was the sister of Simeon of Kiev, and a cousin of Ivan III, Grand Prince of Moscow. She married Stephen III of Moldavia in 1463.

Biography 
Evdochia was most probably the mother of Stephen's two sons, Bogdan and Peter, according to historian Jonathan Eagles. Bogdan died in 1479, Peter in 1480. Both sons were buried in the Putna Monastery, established by their father. When Stephen made a donation to the Hilandar Monastery on Mount Athos on 27 July 1466, he specified that the monks should pray for his relatives, including Evdochia and their two children, Alexandru and Olena. Alexandru was most probably identical with Stephen's first-born son and co-ruler who died in 1496, according to Eagles.

She died in the winter of 1467. She was buried in the Mirăuți Church (which was the see of the Metropolitan of Moldavia) in Suceava. Her husband granted 100 beehives, a vineyard and a pond to the church on 15 February 1469. Her tombstone was rediscovered in 1996.

References

Sources 

 
 
 

Gediminids
Royal consorts of Moldavia
1467 deaths
Year of birth unknown
Stephen the Great